San Lorenzo (Spanish for "Saint Lawrence") is a town and municipality of Puerto Rico located in the eastern central region, north of Patillas and Yabucoa; south of Gurabo; east of Caguas and Cayey; and west of Juncos and Las Piedras. San Lorenzo is spread over twelve barrios and San Lorenzo Pueblo (the downtown area and the administrative center of the city). It is part of the San Juan-Caguas-Guaynabo Metropolitan Statistical Area.

San Lorenzo is called "The town of the Samaritans" and "Land of Legends." The surrounding areas produce tobacco and sugar cane.

History
San Lorenzo was founded in 1737 under the name San Miguel de Hato Grande by Valeriano Muñoz de Oneca from Seville, Spain. The original settlers of the then village were the Muñoz de Oneca, López de Alicea, and Sánchez de Cos families. The church was erected in 1811.

Hurricane Maria on September 20, 2017 triggered numerous landslides in San Lorenzo with the significant amount of rainfall.

Geography

San Lorenzo is located in the eastern central region, north of Patillas and Yabucoa; south of Gurabo; east of Caguas and Cayey; and west of Juncos and Las Piedras.

The town is located on a high valley that is formed by the Río Grande de Loíza which flows northwestwards towards the Caguas Valley. The town is located on the San Lorenzo Batholith, which is a mountainous region composed of intrusive igneous rock. It is bordered by the Sierra de Luquillo to the north and by the Sierra de Cayey to the south.

Rivers
Río Cayaguás
Río Emajagua
Río Grande de Loíza
Río de las Vegas

Barrios 
Like all municipalities of Puerto Rico, San Lorenzo is subdivided into barrios and barrios are further divided into sectors.

Cayaguas
Cerro Gordo 
Espino 
Florida 
Hato 
Jagual 
Quebrada
Quebrada Arenas 
Quebrada Honda
Quemados
 San Lorenzo barrio-pueblo

Sectors

Barrios (which are like minor civil divisions) in turn are further subdivided into smaller local populated place areas/units called sectores (sectors in English). The types of sectores may vary, from normally sector to urbanización to reparto to barriada to residencial, among others.

Special Communities

 (Special Communities of Puerto Rico) are marginalized communities whose citizens are experiencing a certain amount of social exclusion. A map shows these communities occur in nearly every municipality of the commonwealth. Of the 742 places that were on the list in 2014, the following barrios, communities, sectors, or neighborhoods were in San Lorenzo: Roosevelt neighborhood, El Bosque, La Marina, Parcelas Jagual (Nuevas y Viejas), Parcelas Quemados and Sector Los Oquendo. Between 2013 and until their arrest by the FBI in 2019, dozens of drug traffickers were operating in the Roosevelt neighborhood and near the Lorenzana public housing residential units in San Lorenzo.

Demographics

Tourism

Landmarks and places of interest
Priscilla Flores Theater
Santuario de la Virgen del Carmen in Montaña Santa
Gallera San Carlos
Río Grande de Loíza (its main source is located within municipal boundaries)
Iglesia Nuestra Señora de las Mercedes (the church located on the main town square); a National Historic Site; built in 1737 and renovated in 1993.
 Hacienda Muñoz

Economy
Agriculture
The economy of San Lorenzo was founded on livestock farming and later included the cultivation of sugar cane, which had been processed on steam-driven farms with oxen. Coffee and fruits are also now cultivated in the municipality. Timber production, which was once very prolific, has declined due to the uncontrolled exploitation of forests.

Industry
Clothing, pharmaceuticals, footwear, electromechanical equipment, industrial and household paints.

Culture

Festivals and events
San Lorenzo celebrates its patron saint festival in September. The  is a religious and cultural celebration that generally features parades, games, artisans, amusement rides, regional food, and live entertainment.

Other festivals and events celebrated in San Lorenzo include:
Three Kings Caroling-January
Cavalcade Moncho Roldán-January
Candelaria Celebrations-February
Kite Festival-March
Cross Celebrations-May
Embroidering and Weave Festival-September
Passion Fruit Festival-November

Sports
 Double-A (baseball) team  - National Champions in 1975, 1997, 1999, 2000, 2001, and 2002
 Agustin Reyes Half Marathon

Government

Like all municipalities in Puerto Rico, San Lorenzo is administered by a mayor. The current mayor is Jaime Alverio Ramos, from the New Progressive Party (PNP). Alverio was elected at the 2020 general election.

The city belongs to the Puerto Rico Senatorial district VII, which is represented by two Senators. In 2012, Jorge Suárez and José Luis Dalmau were elected as District Senators.

Transportation 
There are 49 bridges in San Lorenzo.

Symbols
The  has an official flag and coat of arms.

Flag
The flag of San Lorenzo is divided in four rectangles of equal size, two rectangles are yellow and the other two are striped with red and yellow stripes.

Coat of arms
The grill is the traditional symbol of San Lorenzo, deacon and martyr, patron of the town, because in a grill he underwent the martyrdom, slowly burned to death. The hill or mountain represent the Gregorio Hill, which dominates the San Lorenzo panorama. The cross is one of the heraldic attributes of San Miguel Arcángel.

Notable people
Chayanne - Singer and actor
 Ernestina Reyes “La Calandria” - Singer
José Tous Soto - Former Speaker House Of Representatives 
Antonio Fernós-Isern - Former Resident Commissioner 
José Aponte Hernandéz - Former Speaker House Of Representatives
 Carmita Jiménez - Singer
 Priscila Flores - Singer
El Invader #1- Puerto Rican wrestler
 Dr. Marc H. Rosa, - Former Teacher, School Administrator And University Professor
 Josúe "Jay" Fonseca - Political Commentator
 Edwin Cruz - Lead Singer - “Mechi”
 Antulio Parrilla Bonilla - Father of Puerto Rican Cooperative Movement, Jesuit priest.
 Victor Rivera - Wrestler

See also

List of Puerto Ricans
History of Puerto Rico

References

External links
 San Lorenzo and its barrios, United States Census Bureau
 Puerto Rico Government Directory - San Lorenzo

Municipalities of Puerto Rico
Populated places established in 1811
San Juan–Caguas–Guaynabo metropolitan area